The College of Europe is a post-graduate institute of European studies with its main campus in Bruges, Belgium and a second campus in Warsaw, Poland. The College of Europe in Bruges was founded in 1949 by leading historical European figures and founding fathers of the European Union, including Salvador de Madariaga, Winston Churchill, Paul-Henri Spaak and Alcide De Gasperi as one of the results of the 1948 Congress of Europe in The Hague to promote "a spirit of solidarity and mutual understanding between all the nations of Western Europe and to provide elite training to individuals who will uphold these values" and "to train an elite of young executives for Europe". It has the status of Institution of Public Interest, operating according to Belgian law. The second campus in Natolin (Warsaw), Poland opened in 1992. The College of Europe is historically linked to the establishment of the European Union and its predecessors, and to the creation of the European Movement International, of which the college is a supporting member. Federica Mogherini, former High Representative of the Union for Foreign Affairs and Security Policy, was appointed as the Rector to start in September 2020; former President of the European Council Herman, Count Van Rompuy is chairman of the board.

Each academic year is named after a patron and referred to as a promotion. The academic year is opened by a leading European politician. Alumni of the College of Europe include the former Prime Minister of Denmark Helle Thorning-Schmidt, the former Prime Minister of Finland Alexander Stubb, the former British Deputy Prime Minister Nick Clegg as well as the Minister of Foreign Affairs of Italy Enzo Moavero Milanesi. Many of its alumni go on to serve as diplomats and senior civil servants in European institutions.

The College of Europe was the most represented alma mater (university attended) among senior EU civil servants, based on a sample compiled by Politico in 2021.
Politico even dedicated a section of their website to news related to the College of Europe.

History

Hague Congress initiative to create a College of Europe
The College of Europe was the world's first university institute of postgraduate studies and training in European affairs. It was founded in 1949 by leading European figures, such as Salvador de Madariaga, Winston Churchill, Paul-Henri Spaak and Alcide De Gasperi, in the wake of the Hague Congress of 1948, that led to the creation of the European Movement. At the Congress, the Spanish statesman Salvador de Madariaga strongly advocated for the creation of a College of Europe, where graduates from different European states could study together as a way to heal the wounds of the World War II. Although the cultural resolution adopted at the end of the Congress did not include explicit references to the establishment of a College of Europe and only advocated for the creation of a "European Cultural Centre and a European Institute for Childhood and Youth Questions", the idea of establishing a European University was put forward by Congress attendees immediately after the Congress.

A group of Bruges citizens led by the Reverend Karel Verleye succeeded in attracting the college to Bruges. Professor Hendrik Brugmans, one of the intellectual leaders of the European Movement and the President of the Union of European Federalists, became its first Rector (1950–1972). John Bowie, Professor of Modern History at Oxford University, was appointed Director of the first session held by the college, in 1949. Henri van Effenterre, who was a Professor of Ancient History at Caen University and Alphonse de Vreese, International Law professor at the University of Ghent, also contributed to that first session. The topic of that first session taught to the first promotion of the college (frequently called , for it is the only promotion not named after any prominent figure) was "Teaching history and the development of a European spirit in universities".

In the decades that followed the establishment of the institution, students were hosted at the Navarre Hotel in the historic centre of Bruges until 1981. 
The College consolidated itself as an institution specialized in studies focused on the newly established European Communities (the college was founded in 1949, before the communities were established).

Bruges speech by Margaret Thatcher

In 1988, British Prime Minister Margaret Thatcher delivered a speech that became known as the Bruges speech at the College of Europe as part of the opening ceremony for that academic year. The Bruges speech is considered by observers as the cornerstone of the Eurosceptic movement that eventually led to Brexit. Thatcher laid down her vision for Europe, claiming that the European Community should remain an economic union, refusing the claims for a closer political integration made by Commission President Jacques Delors. Thatcher criticised the European project calling it "a European superstate exercising a new dominance from Brussels." The speech was perceived as not only an attack on European federalism but an attack on the European project, as such.

Post-Cold War history
After the fall of communism and changes in Central and Eastern Europe, the College of Europe campus at Natolin (Warsaw, Poland), was founded in 1992 with the support of the European Commission and the Polish government. According to former President of the European Commission Jacques Delors, "this College of Europe at Natolin is more than the symbol of Europe found once again, it is the hope represented in this beautiful historic place. The hope that exchanges can multiply for greater mutual understanding and fraternity". The establishment of a second campus in eastern has been frequently regarded as part of an effort aiming to train young students from eastern countries under the auspices of eastern enlargement. Since the establishment of that second campus in Poland, the college operates as "one College – two campuses," and what was once referred to as the "", is now known as the "".

In 2012, the College of Europe became a supporting member of the European Movement International. The academic year 2018–2019 marked the first time in which a promotion was named after a College alumnus, Manuel Marín, Spanish Statesman, EU Commissioner and acting President of the Commission (known as the "father of the Erasmus Programme"), who had passed away early that year. In 2015, three years before the election of Marín as Patron, former Finnish Prime Minister Alexander Stubb was the first College alumnus to be invited to be the Orateur at the opening ceremony of that academic year.

Former Spanish Minister and Cabinet Spokesperson Íñigo Méndez de Vigo, 9th Baron of Claret, served as chairman of the board from 2009 to 2019; in 2019 former Prime Minister of Belgium and President of the European Council Herman, Count Van Rompuy was appointed the new chairman of the board. In May 2020 Federica Mogherini, former  High Representative of the Union for Foreign Affairs and Security Policy and Vice-President of the European Commission, was appointed rector of the College, the first high ranking political figure from the European Commission to hold the post.

Campuses

Bruges campus

The Bruges campus is situated in the centre of Bruges since its establishment in 1949, which was appointed European Capital of Culture in 2002. Bruges is located in the Flemish Region of Belgium, a Dutch-speaking area, although the college does not use Dutch as one of its working languages.

The college has a system of residences in the centre of Bruges and not far from the Dijver, where the main administrative and academic building and the library are situated. None of the residences lodges more than 60 students so that each residence in fact has its own small multinational and multicultural environment.

It consists of the following campus buildings:

Dijver

The Paul Henri Spaak Building (named after the Belgian socialist politician, and popularly known as Dijver) is the College's main administrative building on the Bruges campus. It hosts the college's main reception, some of its offices, classrooms and the library. It is located on the Dijver Canal. A white classic façade stands at the front of the main building (where the European, Belgian, Flemish and Brugeois flags hang together), while there is a garden in its back side. The garden is used by the students, who frequently spare their break time there due to its proximity to the library (which is connected to the main building by a corridor). Signed portraits of all the orateurs hang in the walls of the main corridor of the building.

The library building was built in 1965. Princess Beatrix of the Netherlands (later Queen Beatrix) laid the first stone of the library in a special commemorative event. Almost three decades after its completion, the library was reformed and enlarged (the works were completed in 1992). Most of the library funds are devoted to European Studies, together with law, economics, and political and administrative sciences. Access to the library is restricted to College students and academic staff. A bust of Salvador de Madariaga presides over the library main reading hall.

Verversdijk

Following the increase in the number of students attending the College each year, the College of Europe (with the support of different entities and institutions, including the Flemish Government and the City of Bruges) reformed the 17th century protected monument of Verversdijk to provide additional lecture theatres (auditoria), teaching rooms and offices for academics, research fellows and staff; and to extend its activities. The reform was led by the office of Xaveer De Geyter Architects (XDGA), and the project was nominated for the Mies van de Rohe award in 2009. The Verversdijk premises began to be used by College students in 2007. Besides its academic and administrative use throughout the course, a cocktail is served in its garden to each promotion, following their graduation ceremony at St. Walburga Church (Bruges).

The historical site of Verversdijk owes its name to fact that the owners of the houses standing there at medieval times were dyers who used wool traded with Scotland, as the area was populated by several Englishmen during the Middle Ages. During the Spanish rule, it hosted the schooling houses and the monastery established by the Jesuits in the 17th century. In 1792, the monastery auditorium was used as a meeting place by the Jacobin Club. The main monastery wing (dating back to 1701, and whose façade was plastered in 1865) was built along the canal, and was used as an athenaeum since 1851. its long inner corridor is an outstanding example of the rococo style in Bruges, whereas, the ashlar staircase is also an element of artistic relevance. The attic of the building, with a total length of 45 meters and a surprisingly well-preserved oak canopy, is currently used as a study room. During the First World War occupation of Belgium, the attic was used as a sleeping room for soldiers of the German Marine.

The monastery wing was also home to the Museum of Modern Painting from 1898 to 1931 (when they were transferred to the newly established Groeninge Museum). Since 2008, following and agreement between the College and the Groeninge Museum, the college hosts the 'Extraordinary Groeninghe Art Collection', an installation of contemporary works of art featuring international artists at Verversdijk's hallways. Members of the Groeninghe Art Collection meet every two months at the College to discuss art, attend lectures by art experts and consider possible purchases.

In March 2014, the so-called China Library was established at the Verversdijk compound. A project sponsored by the Information Office of the State Council of the Chinese Government, the library (decorated in Chinese style) is home to ten thousand books and documents in more than six languages, as frequently hosts events related with Sino-European relations or the Chinese culture.

Garenmarkt
The Hotel Portinari in Garenmarkt 15 with its classical façade was formerly home to Tommaso Portinari, the administrator of the Florentine "Loggia de Medici" in the 15th century in Bruges. It contains eleven apartments for professors and forty student rooms, two "salons" in 19th-century style, the "salon du Recteur" with 18th-century wall paintings and a modern "Mensa" for students. A room dedicated to Winston Churchill (who was among the voices calling for the establishment of the College during The Hague Congress in 1948 and was one of its founders the year after) was inaugurated by his grandson, Sir Nicholas Soames, and the British ambassador in 2017. Garenmarkt also hosts the canteen for all College students.

Biskajer
The residence is located in a home built in classicist style during the 19th century. The building is located in Biskajersplein, a small square named after the Spanish region of Biscay (the square is located on the side the dock where ships coming in from that region unloaded their merchandise in the 15th and 16th centuries). The actual residence is located on the lot occupied by the Mareminne house, which hosted the consulate of Biscay in the past, although the original building was demolished. Traces of the old consulate building can be found in the inner garden of the residence, which kept the shape of the consulate's horse stable. The residence hosts 53 students every year.

Gouden Hand
The Gouden Hand residence is housed in a Bruges-style building dating back to the 17th century. It is a listed monument. It was renovated during the 2005–2006 academic year. The name of the residence, directly translates from Dutch to "Golden Hand", after a Medieval legend about the canal bordering the residence. Gouden Hand is also the name of two streets along the same canal. The 15th century painter Jan Van Eyck lived and owned a studio in the Gouden-Handstraat nr. 6, behind the current residence.

The Gouden Hand student bar is situated in the cellar. The building has been a backdrop for many films and documentaries.

Natolin campus

The Natolin Warsaw campus of the college was established in 1992 responding to the revolutions of 1989 and ahead of Poland's accession negotiations with the EU.

The Natolin Campus is located in a historic palace, part of a 120-hectare park and nature reserve—formerly the Royal hunting palace of Natolin—situated in the southern part of Warsaw about 20 minutes by metro from the city centre. The Natolin European Centre Foundation takes care of the complex and has conducted restoration of the former Potocki palace, making it available for the college.

The old historical buildings, including the manor house, the stables and the coach house, were converted to the needs of modern times and new buildings were constructed in a style preserving the harmony of the palace and its outlying park.

In 2022, the Natolin campus of the College of Europe hosted one of the four European citizens’ panels, organised as part of the EU's Conference on the Future of Europe.

Student life

The College of Europe is bilingual. Students are expected to be proficient in English and French. Students receive an advanced master's degree following a one-year programme. Students specialise in either European Political and Administrative Studies, EU International Relations and Diplomacy Studies, European Law, European Economic Studies, or European Interdisciplinary Studies (at the Natolin campus). For much of its history, the college only admitted a few students, the number has increased since the 1990s.

Admissions 
Application may be made to national selection committees or by direct application to the College of Europe for individuals from a country where no selection committee exists. As of 2014, there are 28 national selection committees.

Traditions
The College of Europe has developed several traditions. Some are shared with the École nationale d'administration (ENA) in France. Both the College and ENA name their promotions after a historical figure, being in the College of Europe an outstanding European figure, which is called "patron". Besides the choice of a prominent historical figure to name each promotion, each academical year is traditionally inaugurated by a prominent European figure. Furthermore, each year, College of Europe students are named honorary citizens of Bruges prior to their departure. Another tradition dating back to the first years of existence of the college is the visit to Flanders fields during the first weeks of the academic year. During that visit, students lay a floral tribute at the Menin Gate war memorial in Ypres.

Promotions 
Academic years at the College are known as promotions. Each promotion is named after an outstanding European, referred to as the promotion's patron.

The opening ceremony each year is presided over by a prominent politician, referred to as the Orateur; they have included Angela Merkel, David Miliband, Jean-Claude Juncker, Javier Solana, José Manuel Barroso, Valéry Giscard d'Estaing, Juan Carlos I of Spain, Margaret Thatcher and François Mitterrand. Being invited as the college's Orateur is considered a high honour.

Notable alumni
Many former students of the college, referred to as anciens (French for alumni), have gone on to serve as government ministers, members of various parliaments, diplomats and high-ranking civil servants and executives.

A list of all alumni from 1949 to 1999 is included in the book The College of Europe. Fifty Years of Service to Europe (1999), edited by Dieter Mahncke, Léonce Bekemans and Robert Picht.

Alumni of note of the College of Europe (from 1949) include

Gaetano Adinolfi, former Deputy Secretary General of the Council of Europe
Alberto Alemanno, Professor of Law at New York University School of Law and HEC Paris, CEO of eLabEurope
Frans Alphons Maria Alting von Geusau, Dutch legal scholar and diplomat
Bernadette Andreosso-O'Callaghan, French-Irish economist, Jean Monnet Professor of Economics at the University of Limerick
Peter Arbo, Norwegian academic
Árni Páll Árnason, Icelandic Minister of Economic Affairs. Promotion Mozart.
Ioanna Babassika, Greek human rights lawyer, member of the Committee for the Prevention of Torture
María Angeles Benítez Salas, Spanish European civil servant, director-general of the Directorate-General for Agriculture and Rural Development
Ledi Bianku, judge at the European Court of Human Rights
Margunn Bjørnholt, Norwegian sociologist
Iwo Byczewski, former Polish Deputy Foreign Minister (1991–1995), Ambassador to Belgium and Permanent Representative to the European Union
Geert Van Calster, Belgian lawyer and legal scholar
Sofie Carsten Nielsen, Danish Minister for Higher Education and Science. Promotion Aristotle
Franz Ceska, Austrian Ambassador to Belgium and France, Permanent Representative to the United Nations in Geneva
Poul Skytte Christoffersen, Danish Permanent Representative to the European Institutions, Special Advisor to The Right Honourable Catherine Ashton, Baroness Ashton of Upholland, the High Representative of the Union for Foreign Affairs and Security Policy
Nick Clegg, British politician, former Deputy Prime Minister of the United Kingdom, leader of the Liberal Democrats and member of the European Parliament
Luc Coene, Belgian economist and Governor of the National Bank of Belgium (NBB)
Karl Cox, Vice President of the Oracle Corporation
Martin Donnelly, British civil servant
Niels Egelund, Danish diplomat, former Permanent Representative to NATO and Ambassador to France
Jonathan Faull, Director General for the Internal Market and Services
Monique Pariat, Director-General for the Directorate-General for Migration and Home Affairs and previously Director-General for the Directorate-General for European Civil Protection and Humanitarian Aid Operations.
Mary Finlay Geoghegan, Justice of the Supreme Court of Ireland.
Nigel Forman, British MP and Minister of Higher Education (1992), a member of the Conservative Party
Gabriel Fragnière, Swiss academic
Louise Fréchette, Deputy Secretary-General of the United Nations
Francesco Paolo Fulci, former Permanent Representative of Italy to the United Nations (1993–1999), currently serving as President of Ferrero SpA
Otto von der Gablentz, German diplomat and academic
Luis Garicano, Professor of Economics and Strategy at the London School of Economics
Miriam González Durántez, Spanish lawyer and wife of Nick Clegg
Fiona Hayes-Renshaw, Irish academic, visiting professor at the college since 2001
Chris Hoornaert, Ambassador of Belgium to the Netherlands
Simon Hughes, British politician and Liberal Democrat Member of Parliament
Marc Jaeger, judge at the General Court of the EU
Josef Joffe, German editor and publisher of Die Zeit and adjunct professor of political science at Stanford University
Claudia Kahr, judge at the Austrian Constitutional Court
Alison Kelly, Irish ambassador to Israel
Stephen Kinnock, Director at the World Economic Forum
Berno Kjeldsen, Danish ambassador
Lars-Jacob Krogh, journalist
Sabino Fornies Martínez, European Commission Civil Servant, Head of task force at DG FISMA since 2017
Brigid Laffan, Director of the Robert Schuman Centre for Advanced Studies at the European University Institute
Jo Leinen, German member of the European Parliament, former president of the Union of European Federalists
Christian Lequesne, Professor of European Politics at Sciences Po, the College of Europe and the London School of Economics
Leif Terje Løddesøl, former Chair of Statoil
Sylvie Lucas, Luxembourg's ambassador to the United Nations and president of the United Nations Economic and Social Council (ECOSOC) (2009–2010)
Aude Maio-Coliche, Ambassador, Head of the EU Delegation to Venezuela
Helena Malikova, EU civil servant and academic
Manuel Marín, former President of the European Commission
Thomas Mayr-Harting, Ambassador, Head of the Delegation of the European Union to the United Nations 
Ian McIntyre, British journalist
David McWilliams, Irish economist, journalist and documentary-maker
Holger Michael, German ambassador
Enzo Moavero Milanesi, Minister of Foreign Affairs of Italy
Goenawan Mohamad, Indonesian poet
Juan Moscoso del Prado, Spanish socialist Member of Parliament, spokesman in the European Union Committee
Jon Ola Norbom, former Minister of Finance of Norway
Jim Oberstar, member of the United States House of Representatives
Mary O'Rourke, barrister
David O'Sullivan (civil servant), Chief Operating Officer of the European Union's diplomatic corps, former Secretary-General of the European Commission and Director General for Trade
Valerie Plame, former United States CIA Operations Officer
Ursula Plassnik, former Foreign Minister of Austria, a member of Austrian People's Party (European People's Party)
Nikola Poposki, Macedonian Minister for Foreign Affairs and former Ambassador of the Permanent Mission of the Republic of Macedonia to the European Union
Xavier Prats Monné, EU official
Torolf Raa, former Norwegian ambassador
Carine Van Regenmortel, Belgian corporate lawyer
Philippe Régnier, Professor at the Graduate Institute of International and Development Studies and the University of Ottawa
Prince Albert Rohan, former Permanent Secretary of the Austrian Foreign Ministry, UN envoy
Margaritis Schinas, Vice-President of the European Commission
György Schöpflin, a Hungarian academic and politician, Member of the European Parliament for Fidesz and the European People's Party
Guy Spitaels, Belgian politician and Minister-President of Wallonia
Alexander Stubb, Finnish Minister for Foreign Affairs, a member of politician of the National Coalition Party (European People's Party)
Helle Thorning-Schmidt, Prime Minister of Denmark and leader of the Social Democrats (Denmark)
Didrik Tønseth, former Norwegian ambassador
Count Ferdinand Trauttmansdorff, Austria's ambassador to Prague
Loukas Tsoukalis, Jean Monnet Professor of European Integration at the University of Athens and President of the Hellenic Foundation for European and Foreign Policy
Andrew Tyrie, Member of Parliament (MP) for Chichester and Chairman of the Treasury Select Committee, a member of Conservative Party
Helmut Türk, judge at the International Tribunal for the Law of the Sea, former Ambassador of Austria to the United States
Werner Ungerer, German diplomat, Permanent Representative to the European Communities from 1985 to 1990 and rector of the college from 1990 to 1993
Robert Verrue, Director-General for Employment of the European Commission
Alexander Walker, British film critic
Helen Wallace, Lady Wallace of Saltaire, British expert in European studies and Emeritus Professor at the London School of Economics and Political Science
Bruno de Witte, Professor of EU Law at the European University Institute
Marc van der Woude, judge at the European Court of Justice
Adrien Zeller, former French minister in the second Jacques Chirac government (1986–1988), former President of Alsace Regional Council, a member of the Union for a Popular Movement
Jaap de Zwaan, Dutch diplomat and negotiator of several European treaties, Professor of EU Law at the Erasmus University Rotterdam
Alexander Stubb, prime minister of Finland

Alumni of note of the College of Europe in Natolin, Poland (from 1993) include:

Gert Antsu, Ambassador Extraordinary and Plenipotentiary of the Republic of Estonia to Ukraine
Jarosław Domański, Ambassador Extraordinary and Plenipotentiary of the Republic of Poland to the Islamic Republic of Iran
Marija Pejčinović Burić, Deputy Prime Minister of Croatia, Minister of Foreign and European Affairs
Alyn Smith, Scottish member of the European Parliament
Olesea Stamate, Minister of Justice of the Republic of Moldova
Rafał Trzaskowski, Mayor of Warsaw, former member of the Polish Sejm, former Polish member of the European Parliament, former Polish Minister of Administration and Digitization, former Secretary of State in the Polish Ministry of Foreign Affairs

Faculty and organisation
The College of Europe originally had no permanent teaching staff; the courses were taught by prominent academics and sometimes government officials from around Europe. Especially in the last couple of decades, the college has increasingly employed professors and other teaching staff on a permanent basis.

Academics

 Dominique Moïsi, co-founder and is a senior advisor of the Paris-based Institut Français des Relations Internationales (IFRI), Pierre Keller Visiting Professor at Harvard University, and the Chairholder for Geopolitics at the College of Europe.
 Bronisław Geremek, Chairholder of the Chair of European Civilisation until his death
 Leszek Balcerowicz, economist, the former chairman of the National Bank of Poland and Deputy Prime Minister in Tadeusz Mazowiecki's government. He implemented the Polish economic transformation program in the 1990s, a shock therapy commonly referred to as the Balcerowicz Plan
 Andrea Biondi, co-Director of the Centre for European Law at King's College London
 Aleš Debeljak, cultural critic, poet, and essayist
 Alyson Bailes, a former English diplomat and British Ambassador to Finland who lives in Iceland
 Valentine Korah, Emeritus Professor of Competition Law at University College London
 Jacques Rupnik, professor at Institut d'Études Politiques de Paris i.e. Sciences Po
 Stefan Collignon, professor of political economy, International Chief Economist of the Centro Europa Ricerche, founder of Euro Asia Forum at Sant'Anna School of Advanced Studies, Pisa, Italy, he served as Deputy Director General for Europe in the Federal Ministry of Finance (Germany) 1999–2000.
 John Usher, legal scholar
 Guy Haarscher, legal and political philosopher
 Geoffrey R. Denton, head of economics
 Jan de Meyer (1958–1970)
 Dieter Mahncke
 Léonce Bekemans
 Fiona Hayes-Renshaw
 Gerhard Stahl
 Shada Islam
 Christian Lequesne
 Enzo Moavero Milanesi, Italian Minister for Europe and Professor in the Legal Studies Department
 Alexander Stubb, Finnish Minister for Europe, former Foreign Minister, and Professor at the college since 2000
 Norman Davies, Historian; Honorary fellow, St Antony's College, Oxford, Oxford University; Professor, Jagiellonian University 
 Jean de Ruyt, Ambassador; Senior European Policy Advisor, Covington & Burling ; Professor, Université catholique de Louvain (UCL); ex-Belgian Permanent representative to the European Union

Organisation

Rectors 
The rector directs and coordinates the college's activities.
 Hendrik Brugmans (1906–1997) (1949–1971)
 Jerzy Łukaszewski (°1924) (1972–1990)
 Werner Ungerer (°1927) (1990–1993)
 Gabriel Fragnière (1934-2015) (1993–1995)
 Otto von der Gablentz (1930–2007) (1996–2001)
 Piet Akkermans (1942–2002) (2001–2002)
 Robert Picht (1937–2008) (a.i. 2002–2003)
 Paul Demaret (2003–2013)
 Jörg Monar (2013–2020)
 Federica Mogherini (2020–present)

Vice rectors 
The vice rector is responsible for the day-to-day administration of the Natolin (Warsaw) campus.
Ettore Deodato (1993)
David W. P. Lewis (1994–1996)
Jacek Saryusz-Wolski (1996–1999)
Piotr Nowina-Konopka (1999–2004)
Robert Picht (a.i. 2004–2005)
Robert Picht (2005–2007)
Ewa Ośniecka-Tamecka (2007– present)

Presidents of the Administrative Council 
 Salvador de Madariaga (1950–1964)
 Jean Rey (1964–1974)
 François-Xavier Ortoli (1974–1975)
 Daniel Coens (1985–1990)
 Manuel Marín (1990–1995)
 Jacques Delors (1995–2000)
 Jean-Luc Dehaene (2000–2009)
 Íñigo Méndez de Vigo (2009 – 2019)
 Herman Van Rompuy (2019–present)

Controversies

Controversy concerning Saudi Arabia 

In February 2019, a series of press pieces published by EUobserver revealed that the Bruges-based institute was paid by the Saudi government to set up private meetings between Saudi ambassadors, EU officials, and MEPs. Although EU lobby transparency rules say that academic institutions should register if they "deal with EU activities and policies and are in touch with the EU institutions", the College of Europe is not listed in the EU joint-transparency register. On 13 February, MEP Alyn Smith of Greens/EFA wrote to ask Jörg Monar, Rector of the College of Europe, to provide assurances that the institute has not received "financial contributions from the Saudi authorities in any form" in its efforts to set up meetings with the EU institutions. On 20 February, Marietje Schaake of the ALDE group presented a written question to the European Commission on this issue. This written question was the subject of a response from the European Commission published on 17 May in which it explained not having any direct evidence as to the facts reported, nor being able to comment on the sources of revenue of the College of Europe beyond European subsidies. A group of College alumni collected signatures to demand the institution to stop organising private meetings between MEPs and the Saudi government.

In a letter to the President of the European Parliament's Budget Control Committee Ingeborg Gräßle, Jörg Monar, Rector of the College of Europe, confirmed the organization of trainings for Saudi officials and criticized the media for reporting them as lobbying. The rector indicated that these meetings had no lobbying dimension but sought to show to the Saudis the reasons why the Union defended certain values, privileging communication over isolation to defend European values.

Inside Arabia Online, an online publication, characterised the lobbying by Saudi Arabia as part of a concerted effort to reverse the Kingdom's inclusion on the EU's "blacklist", which intends to penalize countries failing to combat terrorism financing and money laundering.

Allegations of sexual harassment and misogyny 

The French language weekly news magazine Le Vif/L'Express published an article on 21 February 2019 based on the testimony of former students from recent years. The article reported a culture of sexual harassment and misogyny at the College of Europe. Cases of sexual harassment and inappropriate behaviour were described in the magazine, including frotteurism, forced kisses and groping. Various students reported to Le Vif/L’Express that the administration observes a code of silence on this issue. Cases of inappropriate behaviours by the academic staff were also reported. Contacted by Le Vif/L’Express magazine, the administration replied that: "In some occasions in the past, some students have crossed the personal barriers of other students". On 5 March 2019, a former student of the College of Europe, published an opinion in Le Vif/L’Express magazine, stating that a culture of sexual harassment and misogyny existed at the College of Europe when she was studying there.

Jungle comments by Josep Borrell
In October 2022, EU's High Representative of the Union for Foreign Affairs and Security Policy Josep Borrell made offensive comments in a speech to the College of Europe's new European Diplomatic Academy in Bruges. In his speech Borrell designated Europe as “a garden” and he called most of the world a “jungle” that “could invade the garden”. Federica Mogherini, the rector of the College of Europe was hosting Josep Borrell, who succeeded her in the function of High Representative of the Union for Foreign Affairs and Security Policy of the EU. Federica Mogherini did not express any disagreement with the offensive comments, provoking reactions of disapproval among students of the College.

See also

 École nationale d'administration
 Europa-Institut of Saarland University
 European Academy of Sciences and Arts
 European University Institute
 List of College of Europe presidents
 List of College of Europe rectors and vice-rectors
 List of Jesuit sites

References

Further reading
 Karel Verleye, De stichting van het Europacollege te Brugge, Stichting Ryckevelde, 1989.
 Dieter Mahncke, Léonce Bekemans, Robert Picht, The College of Europe. Fifty Years of Service to Europe, College of Europe, Bruges, 1999. . Includes a list of all graduates 1949–1999.
 Paul Demaret, Inge Govaere, Dominik Hanf (eds), Dynamiques juridiques européennes. Edition revue et mise à jour de 30 ans d'études juridiques européennes au Collège d'Europe, Cahiers du Collège d'Europe, P. I. E. Peter Lang, Brussels, 2007.

External links

Politico – College of Europe section
Alumni Association – College of Europe
The Madariaga – College of Europe Foundation 
Behind the Walls, article by a College alumnus – Europe&Me Magazine

 
Educational institutions established in 1949
Buildings and structures in Bruges
Universities and colleges in Warsaw
Universities in Belgium
Schools of international relations
Education in Bruges
1949 establishments in Belgium